Torsten Bell is the chief executive of the Resolution Foundation, an economic thinktank. He was appointed in 2015, having been Ed Miliband's head of policy and a Treasury civil servant who became special adviser to Alistair Darling.

Bell has been associated with the coordination of policy developments for the Labour Party. He has received recognition across various factions within the party for his attention to detail.

Bell writes regularly about poverty and inequality in the United Kingdom, about the North–South divide in England and the levelling-up policy of the British government. He described the September 2022 United Kingdom mini-budget as "the biggest unforced economic policy error of my lifetime." 

In November 2022, Bell was appointed Honorary Professor at the UCL Policy Lab.

References

English economists
British nonprofit chief executives
Labour Party (UK) politicians
Year of birth missing (living people)
Living people